Pushmataha Landing, also known as Pushmataha, is an unincorporated community located in Coahoma County, Mississippi, United States.

History
Pushmataha Landing was named after Pushmataha, a Choctaw chieftain. A post office operated under the name Pushmataha from 1880 to 1922.

References

Unincorporated communities in Mississippi
Unincorporated communities in Coahoma County, Mississippi
Mississippi placenames of Native American origin